During the 2014–15 season, the Guildford Flames participated in the semi-professional English Premier Ice Hockey League. It was the 23rd year of Ice Hockey played by the Guildford Flames and the eighth season under Paul Dixon as head coach.

Season
Departing the club were Ricky Skene, Andrew Sharp, Dean Holland, Nicky Watt, Martin Opatovsky and Mark Lee. Long term Flames forwards Milos Melicherik and Stuart Potts left their playing roles and joined the coaching staff. Joining the club were veteran Danny Meyers, the Canadian forward Andrew McKinney, Defenceman Sam Godfrey, and former National Hockey League and Great Britain National team forward Owen Fussey.

Prior to the fixture list being revealed the EIHA announced that teams from the English Premier Ice Hockey League and National Ice Hockey League would face each other in a revamped English Challenge Cup competition.

It was announced in November 2014 that Ollie Bronnimann had left the club by mutual consent. On Sunday 23 November 2014 the Guildford Flames announced they had also released Curtis Huppe. The month also saw the arrival of Slovakian forward Vladimir Kútny, and the departure of Canadian forward, Owen Fussey.

December saw more changes to the roster with the Flames adding 33-year-old Slovakian forward Roman Tvrdon.

On Friday 24 October 2014, it was announced on the Guildford Flames official website that the club match programme would be replaced by a free, electronic version of the programme which was posted on GuildfordFlames.com to download and view or print before home matches.

The teams finished runners-up in the league to the Telford Tigers. The Tigers also secured eight victories in eight games in all competitions during the season against Guildford, beating them on six occasions in the league, and defeating them in both legs of the Cup Semi-final. The Flames lost the final five games of the season (including both legs of the Play-off Quarter-Final against the Milton Keynes Lightning). It would mean that for the first time in their history as a league member, and after nine consecutive EPIHL final-four play-off appearances, the Guildford Flames would not compete at Coventry in the Finals weekend.

Roster

Player statistics

Netminders

Standings

English Premier League

[*] Secured play-off berth. [**] EPL League Champions

English Premier Cup – Southern Division

English Premier Cup – Northern Division

Schedule and results

Pre-season
The Flames new campaign got underway with a pair of challenge matches against the Basingstoke Bison. The Flames won the first game in Basingstoke, however the Bison gained revenge the following evening in Guildford with a convincing 6–2 victory.

Regular season

Play-offs

References

External links
Official Guildford Flames website

Guildford Flames seasons
Guildford Flames